is a passenger railway station in the city of Funabashi, Chiba, Japan, operated by the third sector railway operator Tōyō Rapid Railway.

Lines
Hasama Station is a station on the Tōyō Rapid Railway Line, and is 6.1 km from the starting point of the line at Nishi-Funabashi Station.

Station layout 
The station consists of two elevated opposed side platforms with the station building underneath.

Platforms

History
Hasama Station was opened on April 27, 1996.

Passenger statistics
In fiscal 2018, the station was used by an average of 9,888 passengers daily.

Surrounding area
Funabashi City Hall Shibayama Branch Office
 Funabashi City New Takane Public Hall
Chiba Prefectural Funabashi Higashi High School
Chiba Prefectural Funabashi Shibayama High School
Funabashi City Shibayama Junior High Schook
Toyo Gate 
It is registered on Important Cultural Property (Japan), and located near Toyo High School managed by Funabashi Gaken.
Omiya Shrine

See also
 List of railway stations in Japan

References

External links

 Tōyō Rapid Railway Station information 

Railway stations in Japan opened in 1996
Railway stations in Chiba Prefecture
Funabashi